The Torrington Company was a firm that developed in Torrington, Connecticut, emerging as a rename from the Excelsior Needle Company.  It used a "cold swaging" technique to create sewing machine needles and other needles from cold metal, and was the largest employer in Torrington. in addition to its main facilities in Torrington, it acquired a division, located in South Bend, Indiana.

Later as a leading manufacturer of anti-friction bearings and a Fortune 500 company, The Torrington Company sold its products, which also included an array of metal parts and assemblies, to a variety of major global industries.

Company Overview
Originally a sewing needle manufacturer, Torrington diversified and grew over the years, becoming a discernibly different company with each passing decade. During the 1930s, the company diversified into anti-friction bearings and from that point forward evolved into the formidable force it represented during the 1990s.

In 1968 the management sold the company to Ingersoll Rand. It was later purchased in 2003 by the Timken Company. The Timken company utilized its Heavy Bearing plants and later Needle Bearing plants along with Torrington brand name was sold to JTEKT in 2009.

Company History
In the nineteenth-century Connecticut was home to several inventive "Nutmeggers," including Samuel Colt, who developed the first revolver, Eli Whitney, whose invention of the cotton gin revolutionized the cotton industry, and Elias Howe, a transplanted "Nutmegger" from neighboring Massachusetts who made his life's discovery in New Hartford, Connecticut, where he recorded the first of two landmark achievements that would launch the predecessor to The Torrington Company into business.

In 1846, Elias Howe designed an early version of the sewing machine. Howe's invention represented a historic advancement in technology to be sure, but there were critical problems with his new machine that made its usefulness not quite the labor-saving device it purported to be. The chief problem with Howe's machine was the ineffectiveness of the needles it employed; Howe, in essence, had created a razor without the blades. In the years following his discovery, the sewing needles that existed were imprecise pins of steel hammered out essentially the same way a blacksmith formed a horseshoe. It was a crude method that produced imperfect results, frequently leaving the purchasers of Howe's machine with broken needles they had pounded out by hand. Twenty years would pass before a suitable solution was found.

The solution arrived—at first unbeknownst to its creators—in 1864, when another transplanted "Nutmegger," a former Vermont toolmaker, Orrin L. Hopson, and his associate, Herman P. Brooks, made their own pivotal discovery in Waterbury, Connecticut. Hopson and Brooks developed and patented a machine that year described as "An Improvement in Pointing Wire for Pins," which perhaps was as specific a use for the machine as the two inventors had in mind. Their machine could compress a section of steel but for what purpose and to whose interest, they were unclear. The two designers of the wire-compressing machine decided to leave Waterbury to find a market for their invention. Hopson and Brooks, who reacted to their discovery with a decided entrepreneurial bent, had settled by 1866 in Wolcottville, Connecticut, by which time they had determined that the marketability of their invention was not the machine itself but the products it could manufacture: sewing machine needle blanks.

Excelsior Needle Company
In Wolcottville, the central part of the city of Torrington, which had been for years a hub of numerous light-manufacturing activities, Hopson and Brooks convinced seven local businessmen that their machine could produce sewing machine needle blanks superior to those already in existence. A company called Excelsior Needle Company was organized in February 1866 to create a manufacturing concern inspired by Hopson's and Brooks' machine and what it could produce. Hopson and Brooks received 100 of the 800 shares composing Excelsior Needle stock, relinquished their patent rights for $5,000, and left the realization of their invention's potential in the hands of Achille F. Migeon, Excelsior Needle's president, and Charles Alvord, the company's secretary and treasurer.

Migeon and Alvord wasted no time in getting the business started, obtaining a two-story, 16-room building for $3,000 six days after they were elected to their posts. The wood-framed structure became Excelsior Needle's first factory. By 1868, two years after beginning business, Excelsior Needle had produced enough sewing needles to begin selling them to sewing machine manufacturers, the largest of which was the Singer Company. Two years later, when roughly 700,000 sewing machines were being manufactured each year, fueling demand for Excelsior Needle's products, the fledgling manufacturing concern had sold enough needle blanks to warrant the relocation of its operations to larger quarters closer to rail transportation.

By the mid-1870s, Excelsior Needle was churning out 30,000 sewing needles a day, six days a week, and generating approximately $75,000 a year in sales. Soon thereafter, the company's sales volume rose even further above that level. The solid foundation Excelsior Needle had established during its first decade—by helping to create a new American industry—provided a stable springboard for growth that carried the company through the 1880s and toward its first defining decade.

During the 1890s, Excelsior Needle diversified its business line, expanded its business overseas, and established the first of many acquisitions. Perhaps the most notable change that occurred during the decade was a symbolic one—the first link to The Torrington Company. In 1890, before Torrington entered the scene, Excelsior Needle absorbed Springfield, Massachusetts-based National Needle Company, a competing needle manufacturer that had first opened its doors 18 years earlier, in 1873. The addition of National Needle's assets and its 175 employees occurred during the same year that Excelsior Needle located to a larger factory for the second time to provide for the company's burgeoning growth.

Growth was the dominant theme during the decade, engendering a more well-rounded and financially sound company. As the 1890s progressed, Excelsior Needle diversified into a number of new areas, including the manufacture of knitting machine latch needles and the manufacture of heavy hook needles used in the mass production of shoes and other leather goods. Excelsior Needle continued to diversify, forming a subsidiary named Torrington Swaging Company, to manufacture spokes for bicycle wheels. (This was in response to a new feature of the sewing machine industry that took shape during the 1890s: Sewing machine manufacturers, led by the Singer Company, had begun to manufacture bicycles in increasing numbers.) Excelsior Needle also acquired controlling interest in two sales organizations—Boston-based S.M. Supplies Company and New York City-based C.B. Barker & Company—and moved beyond U.S. borders for the first time with the establishment of American Supplies Company in England.

Near the turn of the century, the steady growth during the 1880s and the multifarious outbursts of diversification and expansion during the 1890s had combined to create a prodigious manufacturing force with annual sales amounting to $768,000 by 1898. Much had transpired during the company's first 30 years of business: It had evolved from a small entrepreneurial company that manufactured sewing machine needle blanks to a diversified manufacturing concern which, by the century's conclusion, derived only 25 percent of its sales from the production of sewing needles.

The Torrington Company
Much, however, remained to be accomplished. Migeon and Alvord, still heading the company after three decades, looked to expand further, but the two executors of Excelsior Needle determined that the scope of their operations exceeded the financial clout of their local community. In pursuit of capital then, all the assets of Excelsior Needle were transferred in 1898 to The Torrington Company of Maine, organized two days prior to the transfer for just that purpose. Excelsior Needle acted as the operating company of its parent company, The Torrington Company of Maine, until 1917, when the directors of both companies decided to form a single corporate entity, The Torrington Company of Connecticut. Federal tax laws, however, stipulated that the exchange would result in the payment of capital gains tax, something the directors of the company wished to avoid, so for the next 19 years there were two Torringtons—The Torrington Company of Maine, which acted as a holding company for the second company, and The Torrington Company of Connecticut. Excelsior Needle, meanwhile, disappeared as a distinct corporate entity, continuing on merely as the "Excelsior Plant."

During the two decades bridging the formation of The Torrington Company of Connecticut in 1917 and its dissolution in 1936 when The Torrington Company of Maine absorbed its assets, the diversified manufacturing concern grew in stature, recording notable successes and a share of failures during an era pocked by global conflict. World War I brought Torrington into a new business line when the government requested that the well-known needle manufacturing concern begin producing surgical needles, a complex product to manufacture that Torrington had little interest and no experience in making. Before the war, Europe, particularly England, had been the primary source for surgical needles for the United States, but when World War II broke out, the supply of surgical needles into the United States slowed to a trickle. Torrington compensated for the precipitous drop in surgical needle imports, but only at the government's request. Spark plugs and marine engines, shipped to Torrington's subsidiary in England, and the production of 75 millimeter shells were also included in the company's war-time contributions, but unlike many other manufacturing concerns, Torrington was able to conduct business on a fairly normal level throughout the war, emerging from the war years as strong, if not stronger, than it had entered them.

After the war, Torrington recorded its first debilitative blunder during the 1920s when it began selling electrically powered vacuum cleaners. This debacle of the decade was offset by rousing success in producing wheel spokes for automobile wire wheels. By the 1930s, the Great Depression had created a need for Torrington to search for new business, the pursuit of which led to the most defining moment in the company's history. The epiphany that forever changed Torrington's future and the answer to the company's need for new business had roots stretching back 20 years earlier, back to 1912, when Torrington had acquired a small ball bearing business through an affiliation with an automobile ignition coil and spark plug manufacturer. Initially Torrington's ball bearing business represented a relatively small and insignificant facet of the company's business, but by the mid-1920s it had evolved into a respectable-sized manufacturing operation that produced a wide range of bearings and provided the foundation for a new, larger segment of Torrington's business in the 1930s.

Needle Roller Bearings
The person charged with drumming up new business during the Depression was a research engineer named Edmund K. Brown. He developed a new type of bearing for the company—a needle bearing—that eventually predicated the bulk of Torrington's business. On the heels of Brown's discovery came an important acquisition in 1935, when Torrington acquired the Bantam Ball Bearing Company. Brown's needle bearing and the addition of Bantam Ball Bearing signalled the beginning of a new era for Torrington, a future in which the production of bearings would fuel the company's growth and lift Torrington into the upper echelon of U.S. manufacturers.

This new chapter in the history of Torrington began with a decided flourish during World War II when the company once again manufactured surgical needles to supply the nation's war-time needs. In contrast to World War I, however, Torrington invested considerable effort toward manufacturing its new line of products—bearings. Needle bearings were supplied to the government for a variety of purposes, especially for uses in military aircraft and in B-29 bombers in particular, giving the company's bearing business sufficient momentum to emerge during the postwar era as the driving force propelling the company's growth.

During the two decades following the conclusion of World War II, Torrington's bearing business evolved into the company's mainstay product line, eclipsing the fabrication of needles as the company's primary source of revenue. By 1965, the sale of bearings accounted for more than 60 percent of Torrington's total sales, with needles, sold primarily to the textile and shoe industries, accounting for 30 percent of the company's sales volume.

During that time, Torrington has developed many types of needle bearings for highly specialized combat aircraft and guided missile applications.

Roller Bearings
The U.S. bearing industry by this point was a $1 billion business, having tripled in size since World War II. As a leading producer of a broad line of anti-friction bearings, including needle, ball, roller, and specialty bearings, Torrington had benefited immeasurably from the prolific growth of the bearing industry, while the company's host of other products buttressed its financial performance. In addition to bearings, Torrington's eight domestic plants were devoted to the manufacture of nuts, screws, bolts, metal specialties, spokes and nipples, drill bits, surgeon needles, hooking and felting needles, swaging machines, and a special purpose sewing machine, lending a diversity to the company's business lines that insulated it from cyclical economic conditions to a large extent. Beyond U.S. borders, the Torrington empire comprised manufacturing facilities in England, Canada, Germany, Brazil, Italy, Portugal, and in Japan, giving the company a sizeable presence in key international markets. The domestic and international operations created a solid manufacturing entity that flourished during the 1960s. Sales, which stood at $33.6 million in 1950, totaled $67.5 million in 1960, then shot upward to $93.4 million in 1965. The following year, Torrington celebrated two century marks by reaching its 100th anniversary in business as well as reaching over $100 million in sales. By all accounts, Torrington was a thriving manufacturer—a company that had earned the respect of competitors—and now, as it mapped its course for its second century of business, it began to attract the attention of a handful of suitors intent on acquiring the venerable manufacturing concern.

The Torrington Company was the largest US producer of bicycle pedals from the late 1920s thru the early 1980s that utilized their bearing design, they were the exclusive supplier to Columbia Bicycles (Pope Manufacturing) made in Westfield MA and Schwinn line of bicycles made in Chicago. The pedals are named for their relative size Ex. Torrington 10, or Torrington 20 and are considered to be a durable and excellent design. Well maintained original and restored examples that are intended to be used in classic bicycle restoration can sell for several hundred dollars per pair. The designs have been copied and good quality Asian examples generally sell for between $10 to $50 per pair.

Under Ingersoll-Rand (1968-2003)
Against the backdrop of a nationwide trend of mergers and acquisitions, the directors of Torrington realized that refusing every bid offered for the company was implausible and, perhaps, imprudent. In 1968 then, Torrington's management settled on Ingersoll-Rand, a diversified manufacturer of machinery, tools, and construction equipment. Through an exchange of stock valued at over $200 million, Torrington became an autonomous subsidiary of Ingersoll-Rand that year, embarking on its second century of business under the corporate umbrella of its parent.

As an autonomous subsidiary of Ingersoll-Rand, Torrington's second century began much as the first one had ended, with long-time Torrington officials presiding over the company's activities. New corporate headquarters were completed in 1970, marking the beginning of a decade that would see Torrington's financial performance sputter in the face of recessive economic conditions. Favorable developments came in the form of Torrington's involvement in the manufacture of steering column universal joints for the automotive industry and the continuing success of its needle bearing manufacturing business. Despite these developments, though, profits lagged throughout the decade, leading Ingersoll-Rand to exert its authority over Torrington for the first time by the decade's conclusion. Torrington's needle making business, an intrinsic and formative facet of the company's existence since its inception, was abandoned in 1980 after 114 years of contributing to the company's growth. Since the Ingersoll-Rand merger, Torrington's needle business had produced lackluster results and it was decided that both Torrington's and Ingersoll-Rand's future goals could best be accomplished without the business first launched by Migeon and Alvord.

Merger with Fafnir Bearing Company
Stripped of its needle business, Torrington entered the 1980s as primarily a bearing manufacturer, with needle bearings accounting for 49 percent of the company's sales and heavy bearings contributing another 30 percent. After several years of corporate restructuring, Torrington became a considerably larger bearing manufacturer when the company acquired Fafnir Bearing Company in 1985. Formed, like Torrington, in Connecticut, Fafnir had evolved into a leading bearing producer from its origination in 1911, becoming by the mid-1980s a precision ball bearing manufacturer serving the aerospace, machine tool, industrial, and agricultural industries with distinction. When the two bearing producers were combined in 1985, adding Fafnir's seven manufacturing facilities to Torrington's already numerous manufacturing facilities, the result was the largest bearing manufacturing company in North America and one of the largest in the world, with total sales amounting to roughly $750 million.

The addition of Fafnir provided a powerful boost to Torrington's stature as a bearing manufacturer, coming in a decade during which the company also hailed the accomplishment of significant developmental work in ceramic and sensor bearings. These achievements helped reduce the sting of the lamented divestment of its needle business. By the end of the 1980s, however, Torrington's situation had once again soured, as U.S. competitors in the $3 billion bearing business railed against unfair foreign competition. Torrington was among the pack charging that Asian and European bearing producers were selling bearings below their manufacturing cost, an illegal practice that carried into the early 1990s.

As Torrington sought to bring a favorable conclusion to the contentious legal debate addressing unfair trade practices, the company entered the mid-1990s as a stalwart industry leader. Part of Ingersoll-Rand's Bearings, Locks, and Tools business group, Torrington charted its future course beyond the mid-1990s, buoyed by its more than 125 years of successfully navigating through unseen waters. This legacy of success promised to serve the company well in the years to come, adding a rich history of experience to surmount whatever obstacles loomed in the future.

Under The Timken Company (2003-2009)
Timken approaches Ingersoll-Rand to purchase the industrial side of Torrington's business but soon got interested in its entirety as it realized Torrington's automotive business was stronger than originally thought. It was purchased in 2003 by the Timken Company.

Sold to JTEKT Corporation
Needle bearing plants along with Torrington brand name were sold to JTEKT in 2009 by the Timken Company.

The needle roller bearings business was part of the broader Torrington acquisition Timken made in 2003. The business had approximately 3,400 associates and manufactured highly engineered needle roller bearings, including an extensive range of radial and thrust needle roller bearings, as well as bearing assemblies and loose needles, for automotive and industrial applications.

The following Facilities were sold to JTEKT:

• North America: Cairo, GA; Dahlonega, GA; Sylvania, GA; Greenville, SC; Walhalla, SC; and Bedford, Quebec, Canada.

• Europe: Brno and Olomouc, Czech Republic; Maromme, Moult, and Vierzon, France; Kuensebeck, Germany; and Bilbao, Spain.

• Asia: LiYuan District, China.

References

External links

Companies based in Litchfield County, Connecticut
Sewing
Bearing manufacturers